Guillermo Vilas defeated Jaime Fillol Sr. 6-2, 7-5, 3-6, 6-3 to win the November 1977 ATP Buenos Aires singles competition. Vilas was the defending champion.

Seeds
A champion seed is indicated in bold text while text in italics indicates the round in which that seed was eliminated.

  Guillermo Vilas (Champion)
  Jaime Fillol Sr. (Final)

Draw
 NB: All rounds up to but not including the final were the best of 3 sets. The final was the best of 5 sets.

Final

Section 1

Section 2

External links
 1977 ATP Buenos Aires (November) draw

Singles
November 1977 sports events in South America